Kolczyn may refer to the following places in Poland:
Kolczyn, Masovian Voivodeship
Kolczyn, Lublin Voivodeship
Kołczyn, Lublin Voivodeship
Kołczyn, Lubusz Voivodeship